Robert Leslie Cooke (16 February 1957 – 7 August 2021) was an English footballer and manager who played as a forward in the Football League, most notably for Peterborough United and Brentford. He represented England C at international level while playing non-League football. After retiring from football, Cooke managed Warboys Town and later became a scout.

Club career

Mansfield Town 
Cooke began his career in the youth system at Mansfield Town and made 9 appearances and scoring one goal in his debut season, in which the Stags won the 1976–77 Third Division championship. He made only six appearances in Second Division during the 1977–78 season and departed the club at the end of the campaign, having made just 15 first team appearances for the club.

Grantham 
Cooke joined Southern League First Division North club Grantham during the 1978 off-season and scored 43 goals to propel the club to the 1978–79 division championship. Cooke's performances saw him awarded the Supporters' Player of the Year award. Grantham moved to the Northern Premier League for the 1979–80 season and Cooke was on fire again, scoring 39 goals. He departed the Gingerbreads at the end of the campaign.

Peterborough United 
Cooke's goalscoring exploits for Grantham caught the eye of Fourth Division club Peterborough United, which culminated in him moving to the club for a £12,000 fee in May 1980. He was an immediate hit at Posh, scoring 29 goals in 56 games during the 1980–81 season and being named in the Fourth Division PFA Team of the Year. Cooke bettered his goalscoring tally in the 1981–82 season, with 31 goals in 55 games. Cooke's prolific form tailed off during the 1982–83 season and he managed only 11 goals in 33 appearances before departing in February 1983. Cooke scored 71 goals in 144 appearances for the Posh.

Luton Town (loan) 
Cooke had a loan spell at First Division club Luton Town during the 1982–83 season.

Cambridge United 
Cooke signed for Second Division club Cambridge United in February 1983 for a £12,000 fee. He failed to find his prolific goalscoring form for the struggling club, which suffered relegation to the Third Division at the end of the 1983–84 season. Cooke managed 14 goals in 65 league appearances and with relegation to the Fourth Division looming, he departed the club midway through the 1984–85 season.

Brentford (loan and permanent transfer) 
Cooke joined Third Division club Brentford on a two-month loan in December 1984 and he later signed permanently for fee ranging between £20,000 and £25,000. He quickly found form, scoring 16 goals in 31 games and scoring what proved to be a consolation in the 3–1 1985 Football League Trophy Final defeat to Wigan Athletic. Cooke finished the 1984–85 season as both Brentford and Cambridge United's top scorer, which was only the third time in history the feat had been managed. Three years of mid-table mediocrity followed and Cooke departed Brentford in December 1987, having scored 64 goals in 150 games for the Bees.

Millwall 
Cooke joined Second Division high-flyers Millwall on 11 December 1987 for a £30,000 fee and scored one goal in five appearances during the remainder of the 1987–88 season. He was unable to break up the forward pairing of Tony Cascarino and Teddy Sheringham and departed the Lions in September 1988.

Kettering Town
Cooke dropped back into non-League football to join Conference club Kettering Town in September 1988. He had a prolific spell with the Poppies, scoring 49 goals in 95 appearances across three seasons in which the club consistently challenged for promotion to the Football League.

Non-League nomad 
Cooke ended his career with spells at Northampton Spencer, Bourne Town and a second stint at Grantham Town.

International career 
Cooke's form while at Kettering Town won him England C recognition.

Managerial and coaching career 
Cooke had a spell as player-coach at Southern League Midland Division club Grantham Town during the 1991–92 season. After his retirement from football, Cooke became manager at Eastern Counties League First Division club Warboys Town. In December 1998, Cooke returned to Kettering Town to become assistant manager and first team coach.

Scouting career 
Cooke was invited to become a part-time scout for Preston North End by former Cambridge United teammate and then-Preston manager David Moyes. Cooke subsequently followed Moyes to Premier League club Everton in 2002 and Manchester United in 2013, serving as chief scout at both clubs. After Moyes was sacked by Manchester United in April 2014, Cooke was not retained by incoming manager Louis van Gaal. In November 2014, Cooke was appointed to the role of UK and International Scout at Burnley. By June 2017, he had left the club. Cooke reunited with David Moyes at Premier League club West Ham United in 2020 and held the role of chief scout until his death in August 2021.

Personal life 
Cooke's nephew Russell was also a footballer and played for Hucknall Town, Eastwood Town and Ilkeston Town. Cooke worked for Thomas Cook and later for Travelex in the 1990s and at the time of his death from cancer at Thorpe Hall in August 2021, he was living in Sawtry.

Career statistics

Honours 
Grantham
 Southern League First Division North: 1978–79

Northampton Spencer
 United Counties League Premier Division: 1991–92

Individual
Grantham Supporters' Player of the Year: 1978–79
Football League Fourth Division PFA Team of the Year: 1980–81

References

External links
 

1957 births
2021 deaths
English footballers
Footballers from Rotherham
Association football forwards
Mansfield Town F.C. players
Grantham Town F.C. players
Peterborough United F.C. players
Cambridge United F.C. players
Brentford F.C. players
Millwall F.C. players
Kettering Town F.C. players
Bourne Town F.C. players
English Football League players
Luton Town F.C. players
England semi-pro international footballers
Southern Football League players
National League (English football) players
Preston North End F.C. non-playing staff
Everton F.C. non-playing staff
Manchester United F.C. non-playing staff
Burnley F.C. non-playing staff
Northampton Spencer F.C. players
Warboys Town F.C. managers
English football managers
Deaths from cancer in the United Kingdom
West Ham United F.C. non-playing staff